Augustus Baldwin Longstreet (September 22, 1790 – July 9, 1870) was an American lawyer, minister, educator, and humorist, known for his book Georgia Scenes. He was the uncle of the senior Confederate General James Longstreet. He held pro-slavery and pro-secessionist views, personally owning dozens of slaves throughout his life. He held the presidency positions at several southern universities including, the University of Mississippi (twice), South Carolina College (now the University of South Carolina), and Emory College (now Emory University).

Biography
Longstreet was born in Augusta, Georgia, a son of the inventor William Longstreet. He graduated at Yale University in 1813, studied law in Litchfield, Connecticut, and was admitted to the bar in Richmond County, Georgia.  He soon moved and rose to eminence as a lawyer in Greensboro, Georgia.  He represented Greene County in the state legislature in 1821, and in 1822 became a district judge in Ocmulgee. After several years as a judge, he declined re-election and resumed his legal practice in Augusta, did editorial work, and established the Sentinel, which soon merged with the Chronicle (1838).   In 1838, he became a Methodist minister.  During this period of his ministry, the town was visited with yellow fever, but he remained at his post, ministering to the sick and dying.

In 1839, he was made president of Emory College.  
After nine years he accepted the presidency of Centenary College, Louisiana, then of the University of Mississippi, where he stayed for six years, after which he resigned, and became a planter, but in 1857 became president of South Carolina College.  Just before the Civil War, he returned to his old presidency in Mississippi.

In politics he belonged to the Jeffersonian school of strict construction and states rights. He made speeches on all occasions through his life. "I have heard him," writes one who knew him, "respond to a serenade, preach a funeral sermon, deliver a college commencement address, and make a harangue over the pyrotechnic glorifications of seceding states. He could never be scared up without a speech."

During his years as a Southern Methodist minister Longstreet preached a doctrine of secession and defended slavery. He was conspicuous in the discussions that led to a rupture of his church.  Scholar Lewis M. Purifoy notes that "Augustus B. Longstreet, in a baccalaureate address to the University of South Carolina graduating class of 1859, urged the young men of his audience to defend Southern rights to the utmost.  While they should not strive to break up the Union, they should not ‘make a dishonorable surrender of the thousandth part of the mill more to save it.’  He defended slavery mainly on the ground that freeing [slaves] would be ruinous to Southern society; and the burden of his speech was that the South had suffered long and grievously at the hand of the North.  Longstreet assured the class that secession would not lead to war, but, if it should, a united South would win.

At an early age, he began to write for the press, and his pen was never idle. His chief periodical contributions are to be found in The Methodist Quarterly, Southern Literary Messenger, The Southern Field and Fireside, The Magnolia, and The Orion, and include "Letters to Clergymen of the Northern Methodist Church" and "Letters from Georgia to Massachusetts." His fame is based, however, on a single book, of which he was the author: Georgia Scenes (1835), originally published in newspapers, then gathered into a volume at the South, and finally issued in 1840 in New York. It featured realistic sketches of Southern humor. It is said that he disavowed the second edition (1867) and tried to destroy the first.

Augustus was a mentor for his nephew James Longstreet, and was a long-time friend and associate of John C. Calhoun. He died in Oxford, Mississippi and is buried in section one of St. Peter's Cemetery.

Longstreet's daughter Virginia married the future Supreme Court jurist Lucius Quintus_Cincinnatus_Lamar in Oxford, Georgia in 1847, while Augustus was president of Emory college.  They were married in the "President's House" at Emory, which is today the Dean's residence for Oxford College of Emory University.  The newlywed couple would later follow him to Mississippi when he became president of The University of Mississippi.  American actress Lara Parker is his third-great-granddaughter.

Longstreet Theater on the University of South Carolina campus is named in his honor; in July 2021, the university's Presidential Commission on University History recommended removing his name from the building.

Notes

References

External links 

Georgia Scenes, Characters, Incidents, &c. in the First Half Century of the Republic - digitalized at the University of North Carolina Website
Master William Mitten, A Youth of Brilliant Talents Who was Ruined By Bad Luck - digitalized at the University of North Carolina Website.
 
 
Stuart A. Rose Manuscript, Archives, and Rare Book Library, Emory University: Augustus Baldwin Longstreet papers, 1844-1860

1790 births
1870 deaths
American proslavery activists
American humorists
Augustus Baldwin
University of Mississippi faculty
Yale University alumni
Writers from Augusta, Georgia
Presidents of the University of South Carolina
American newspaper journalists
American Methodist clergy
American planters
Writers of American Southern literature
Journalists from Mississippi